Angela An Youqi (born October 14, 1982) is a Chinese singer who won the first season of Super Girl, a national singing contest, in 2004. Subsequently, she signed a recording contract and released an album which recorded sales of over one million.

Biography
An was born inside a middle-class family in Harbin. When she was still a child, her family relocated to Beijing. At the age of 22, she started training to develop a career as a dancer, but some years later, she started thinking about turning into a singer. She started singing in pubs waiting for being discovered by a talent agent. When the first edition of the Super Girls contest was announced by Hunan TV, she took part in the casting. Finally, she was classified officially as a contestant for the program.

After entering the competition, she started singing in all the events related to the programme, catching instantaneously the attention both from the media and the viewers. At the end, she won the competition and started preparing her first album.

The debut album of An was released with EE Media, a record label where almost all the super girl contestants have been releasing their recordings. The sales of the album were highly successful, selling over a million of copies only in mainland China.

After the release, she started a tour around many cities of China.

The success and the popularity of the singer were on the rise, and many producers and lyricist from Taiwan and Hong Kong (from where many of the biggest stars of Chinese pop music come) were interested in her.

In 2006, she released her second album, which was released under the Taiwanese branch of the Japanese company Avex Trax. She turned into the first mainland Chinese singer to sign with a Japanese label. The second album counted with a huge production effort, with many Taiwanese producers. She made a Chinese version of the song "To be", originally sung by Ayumi Hamasaki.

After the second album, An went on a five-year hiatus. After that, she released Incanto, an EP of three songs, this time with another label, the Beijing-based Yue Hua Yu Le. For this release, she changed radically in style and image and adopted an electronic synthpop sound. One year later, she released Miss An, her third full album, on Warner Music.

Discography

Albums

External links
Official blog – 
Last.FM Information Page – 
Official Avex Site

References

1982 births
Living people

Musicians from Harbin
Super Girl contestants